is a Japanese manga artist. He made his debut with Sono Tomodachi ni Gimon Ari story in 1995 in Weekly Young Magazine. He is best known as the creator of Prison School, which won the General Manga Category award at the 2013 Kodansha Awards, and Me and the Devil Blues, which has won the 2009 Glyph Comics Awards for the Best Reprint Publication.

Works
 (1997–2009) —– Writer, artist
 (2004–2008, 2015–present) —– Writer, artist
 (2007–2008) —– Writer, artist
 (2011) —– Writer, artist
 (2011–2017) —– Writer, artist
Raw Hero (2018–2020) —– Writer, artist
 (2022–present) —– Writer, artist
 (2022–present) —– Artist; written by Muneyuki Kaneshiro

References

External links
 Akira Hiramoto's manga works at Media Arts Database 
 Akira Hiramoto's manga volumes at Kodansha 
 

1976 births
Living people
Manga artists from Okinawa Prefecture
People from Okinawa Prefecture
Ryukyuan people
Winner of Kodansha Manga Award (General)